Romaleinae is a subfamily of lubber grasshoppers in the family Romaleidae, found in North and South America. More than 60 genera and 260 described species are placed in the Romaleinae.

Tribes and genera
These tribes and genera belong to the subfamily Romaleinae:

Tribes A-H

 Acrideumerus Descamps, 1979
 Acridophaea Descamps, 1979
 Agriacris Walker, 1870
 Aplatacris Scudder, 1875
 Aprionacris Descamps, 1978
 Brasilacris Rehn, 1940
 Chariacris Walker, 1870
 Cibotopteryx Rehn, 1905
 Cloephoracris Descamps, 1979
 Coryacris Rehn, 1909
 Costalimacris Carbonell & Campos-Seabra, 1988
 Diponthus Stål, 1861
 Eidalcamenes Rosas Costa, 1957
 Eurostacris Descamps, 1978
 Gurneyacris Liebermann, 1958
 Hisychius Stål, 1878
 Pareusychius Amédégnato & Poulain, 1994
 Porphoracris Descamps, 1979
 Prionacris Stål, 1878
 Pseudaristia Carbonell, 2002
 Pseudeurostacris Descamps, 1978
 Pseudhisychius Descamps, 1979
 Staleochlora Roberts & Carbonell, 1992

Leguini
Auth: Amédégnato & Poulain, 1986
 Ampiacris Amédégnato & Poulain, 1986
 Legua Walker, 1870
 Proracris Uvarov, 1940

Phaeopariini
Auth: Giglio-Tos, 1898
 Abila Stål, 1878
 Albinella Carbonell, 2002
 Aristia Stål, 1876
 Costarica Koçak & Kemal, 2008
 Epiprora Gerstaecker, 1889
 Graciliparia Amédégnato & Poulain, 1994
 Maculiparia Jago, 1980
 Phaeoparia Stål, 1873
 Pseudaristia Carbonell, 2002
 Stornophilacris Amédégnato & Descamps, 1978
 Tepuiacris Carbonell, 2002

Procolpini

Auth: Giglio-Tos, 1898
subtribe Prionolophina Rehn & Grant, 1959
 Alcamenes Stål, 1878
 Colpolopha Stål, 1873
 Draconata Pictet & Saussure, 1887
 Helionotus Rehn, 1909
 Prionolopha Stål, 1873
 Securigera Bolívar, 1909
 Xyleus Gistel, 1848
subtribe Procolpina Giglio-Tos, 1898
 Aeolacris Scudder, 1875
 Munatia Stål, 1875
 Procolpia Stål, 1873
 Prorhachis Scudder, 1875
 Xomacris Rehn, 1955

Romaleini
Auth: Pictet & Saussure, 1887

 Alophonota Stål, 1873
 Antandrus Stål, 1878
 Aplatacris Scudder, 1875
 Brachystola Scudder, 1876 (grassland lubbers)
 Callonotacris Rehn, 1909
 Chromacris Walker, 1870
 Coryacris Rehn, 1909
 Costalimacris Carbonell & Campos-Seabra, 1988
 Diponthus Stål, 1861
 Dracotettix Bruner, 1889 (dragon lubbers)
 Eidalcamenes Rosas Costa, 1957
 Gurneyacris Liebermann, 1958
 Limacridium Carbonell & Campos-Seabra, 1988
 Litoscirtus Bruner, 1907
 Phrynotettix Glover, 1872 (toad lubbers)
 Radacridium Carbonell, 1984
 Romalea Serville, 1831  (lubber grasshopper)
 Spaniacris Hebard, 1937
 Taeniopoda Stål, 1873
 Thrasyderes Bolívar, 1881
 Tytthotyle Scudder, 1897
 Xestotrachelus Bruner, 1913
 Zoniopoda Stål, 1873

Tropidacrini

Auth: Brunner von Wattenwyl, 1893
 Titanacris Scudder, 1869
 Tropidacris Scudder, 1869

Trybliophorini
Auth: Giglio-Tos, 1898
 Trybliophorus Serville, 1831
tribe not placed
 Quitus Hebard, 1924

References

Further reading

External links

 

Romaleidae